Loch Burn is a stream that flows out of the eastern end of Loch Watten in Caithness, in the Highland area of Scotland, at a height of around 20 metres and about one kilometre north/northeast of the village of Watten. Less than a kilometre east of its source at Loch Watten the burn flows into Wick River.

Rivers of Highland (council area)